Cecina is a genus of sea snails which have a gill and an operculum, gastropod mollusks or micromollusks in the family Pomatiopsidae.

They live in shallow waters in littoral and supralittoral habitats.

Distribution 

The distribution of the genus Cecina includes the Sea of Japan in Primorsky Krai, Russia, Japan and Washington state, USA.

Species
In 1861, Arthur Adams described the genus Cecina as a monotypic genus with Cecina manchurica as the only species. 
The current classification of Cecina follows Davis (1979) and other authors.

In 1996, Larisa A. Prozorova reviewed the genus, described 6 new species of Cecina and re-established Cecina tatarica as a separate species.

There are eight species within the genus Cecina:
 Cecina alta Prozorova, 1996
 Cecina elenae Prozorova, 1996
 Cecina kunashirica Prozorova, 1996
 Cecina manchurica A. Adams, 1861 - type species
 Cecina murshudovi Prozorova, 1996
 Cecina satrae Prozorova, 1996
 Cecina scarlatoi Prozorova, 1996
 Cecina tatarica (Schrenck, 1867)

References

External links

Pomatiopsidae